Clifford P. Brangwynne is a professor of chemical and biological engineering at Princeton University and a researcher at the Howard Hughes Medical Institute.

He graduated from Carnegie Mellon University and Harvard University.

Awards 

2023 - Breakthrough Prize in Life Sciences
2021 - HFSP Nakasone Award
2021 - Wiley Prize in Biomedical Sciences
2020 - Blavatnik Awards for Young Scientists
2020 - Michael and Kate Bárány Award
 2018 and 2019 - Finalists for Blavatnik Awards for Young Scientists
2018 - MacArthur Fellowship
2014 - Sloan Research Fellowship
2013 - National Science Foundation CAREER Award
2012 - NIH Director's New Innovator Award
2012 - Searle Scholars Program
2008-2010 - Fellow of Helen Hay Whitney Foundation

References 

Living people
American academics
Princeton University people
Princeton University staff
Year of birth missing (living people)
Carnegie Mellon University alumni
Harvard University alumni